Edwin Morris may refer to:

Edwin Morris (British Army officer) (1889–1970), British Army General
Edwin Morris (bishop) (1894–1971), Bishop of Monmouth and Archbishop of Wales